Frank Lopardo (born 12/23/57) is an American operatic tenor who was born in Brentwood, New York. Early in his career he specialized in the repertoire of Mozart and Rossini and later transitioned to the works of Puccini, Verdi, Donizetti and Bellini.

Early years
Lopardo began his musical training at Queens College, CUNY before moving on to the Juilliard School. At Queens College he first met Dr. Robert White, who currently serves on the staff at the Juilliard School. Lopardo attended the Music Academy of the West summer conservatory program in 1983 and 1984.

Career

Lopardo made his North American debut as Tamino in Die Zauberflöte with Opera Theater of St. Louis. He entered into a long-standing relationship with The Metropolitan Opera in New York in 1989 in the role of Almaviva in Il barbiere di Siviglia. He has performed more than 180 times there, with roles including Tamino in The Magic Flute, Rodolfo in La bohème, Alfredo in La traviata, the Duke in Rigoletto, Edgardo in Lucia di Lammermoor, Tonio in La fille du régiment, Nemorino in L'elisir d'amore, Don Ottavio in Don Giovanni, Idreno in Semiramide, Ferrando in Così fan tutte, and Fenton in Falstaff. He has made appearances with various North American opera companies, including the Lyric Opera of Chicago, Los Angeles Opera, Houston Grand Opera, Dallas Opera, the Canadian Opera Company, San Francisco Opera, and Santa Fe Opera.

In Europe, Lopardo made his debut as Fenton at Teatro di San Carlo in Naples. He has sung as Edgardo, Rodolfo, the Duke, and Lenski in Eugene Onegin at the Opéra National de Paris. At the Royal Opera House, Covent Garden he has sung as Lindoro in L'italiana in Algeri. Other major European theaters where he has performed include the Vienna State Opera, the Grand Théâtre de Genève, Teatro alla Scala in Milan, Teatro Comunale in Florence and Teatro Real in Madrid. He has appeared in the Salzburg Festival, Glyndebourne Glyndebourne Opera Festival, and Aix-en-Provence festivals Aix-en-Provence Festival, and sung with De Nederlandse Opera.

Throughout his career, Lopardo has sung with orchestras around the world. He has performed in Verdi's Requiem with the London Symphony Orchestra and the Montreal Symphony Orchestra, Mozart's Requiem with the Berlin Philharmonic at La Scala, Berlioz's Requiem and Orff's Carmina Burana with the Boston Symphony Orchestra, Beethoven's Ninth Symphony with the San Francisco Symphony Orchestra, Rossini's Stabat Mater with the Philadelphia Orchestra and Dvořák's Requiem with the Danish Radio Symphony Orchestra.

Awards
In 1983, Lopardo won first prize in the Liederkranz Foundation competition. He was awarded an honorary doctorate from Queens College, Aaron Copland School of Music, in 1992, and in 2005 won a Grammy Award for Best Choral Performance for a recording of the Berlioz Requiem, performed with the Atlanta Symphony Orchestra and Chorus and conducted by Robert Spano.

Discography
 Requiem (Mozart), with Riccardo Muti. EMI Records, 1987
 L'italiana in Algeri (Rossini), with Claudio Abbado. Deutsche Grammophon, 1987
 Don Giovanni (Mozart), with Riccardo Muti. EMI Records, 1990
 Great Mass in C minor (Mozart), with Leonard Bernstein. Deutsche Grammophon, 1991
 Falstaff (Verdi), with Sir Colin Davis. BMG Music, 1991
 Il signor Bruschino (Rossini), with Ion Marin. Deutsche Grammophon, 1991
 Il barbiere di Siviglia (Rossini), with Claudio Abbado. Deutsche Grammophon, 1992
 Semiramide (Rossini), with Ion Marin. Deutsche Grammophon, 1992
 Carmina Burana (Orff), with André Previn. Deutsche Grammophon, 1992
 Don Pasquale (Donizetti), with Roberto Abbado. BMG Music, 1993
 Idomeneo (Mozart), with James Levine. Decca Records, 1993
 Così fan tutte (Mozart), with Sir Georg Solti. Decca Records, 1993
 La traviata (Verdi), with (Sir George Solti). Decca Records, 1994
 Requiem (Berlioz), with Robert Spano. Telarc Records, 2003
 Imelda de' Lambertazzi (Donizetti), with Mark Elder. Opera Rara, 2006
 Ninth Symphony (Beethoven), with Franz Welser-Möst. Deutsche Grammophon, 2007

Videography
 Great Mass in C minor (Mozart), with Leonard Bernstein, Deutsche Grammophon, 2006

References

External links 
 

1957 births
Living people
American operatic tenors
People from Brentwood, New York
Queens College, City University of New York alumni
Juilliard School alumni
Singers from New York (state)
20th-century American male opera singers
21st-century American male opera singers
Classical musicians from New York (state)
Music Academy of the West alumni